Erie—Lincoln was a provincial electoral district in Ontario, Canada, that elected members to the Legislative Assembly of Ontario.

The riding was first contested in 1999. Created from the former Lincoln, Brant—Haldimand and Niagara South ridings, it was abolished upon the calling of the 2007 election. It was redistributed into Niagara West—Glanbrook, Haldimand—Norfolk, Niagara Falls and Welland. It consisted of the municipalities of Lincoln, West Lincoln, Wainfleet, Dunnville, Port Colborne and Fort Erie.

Members of Provincial Parliament
For its entire existence, the riding was represented by Tim Hudak, from the Ontario Progressive Conservative Party.

Election results

External links
 Elections Ontario  1999 results and 2003 results

Former provincial electoral districts of Ontario